Death Row: Snoop Doggy Dogg at His Best is the first greatest hits album that includes his hits and also includes 6 never before released songs from Snoop Dogg's Death Row Records days. It was released on October 23, 2001, by Suge Knight
. It was re-released on March 20, 2006.

Although this CD was released in 2001, it only featured songs that Snoop Dogg had recorded during his Death Row era. Therefore, none of the songs from his No Limit releases, "Da Game Is to Be Sold, Not to Be Told", "No Limit Top Dogg", or "Tha Last Meal" were included on this album, even though they were released before this one.

Track listing

Charts

Certifications

References 

 MusicMatch Guide 

2001 greatest hits albums
Albums produced by DJ Pooh
Albums produced by Dr. Dre
Albums produced by Soopafly
Albums produced by Timbaland
Snoop Dogg compilation albums
Death Row Records compilation albums
Priority Records compilation albums
Albums produced by L.T. Hutton
Gangsta rap compilation albums
G-funk compilation albums